The Civic Trust for Wales (Welsh: Ymddiriedolaeth Ddinesig Cymru) was founded in 1964. It is a registered charity.
 
The organisation promotes civic pride as a means to improve the quality of life for all in the places where the Welsh live and work. It encourages community action, good design, sustainable development and respect for the built environment amongst people of all ages.

The Trust is the umbrella body for 56 Civic Societies around Wales. Civic Societies are open to anyone who shares a concern for quality in the built environment, good design and care for the heritage.

The Civic Trust for Wales organises "Open Doors" events  on behalf of Cadw, the historic environment service of the Welsh Government. Open Doors is part of European Heritage Days and is held in the month of September.

In 2015 it was renamed Civic Trust Cymru.

Since 2016 it has been dormant.

References

External links
 www.civictrustwales.org

Conservation in Wales
1964 establishments in Wales
Organizations established in 1964
Interested parties in planning in Wales
Architectural conservation
Charities based in Wales
Cadw
Heritage organisations in the United Kingdom
Architecture in Wales
Civic societies in the United Kingdom